Papuengraulis micropinna, the littlefin anchovy, is a species of marine/brackish water anchovy that is only found in the Gulf of Papua, the mouths of rivers that drain into it and the Arafura Sea.  It is the only species in its genus.

References

Anchovies
Monotypic ray-finned fish genera
Fish of Papua New Guinea
Fish described in 1964